Davallia fejeensis is a species of fern in the family Davalliaceae, commonly referred to as Rabbit's Foot Fern. They are best known for their furry, brown and yellow rhizomes, which looks like a rabbit's foot, hence the name.

It is native to the Fiji Islands in Oceania. They survive from approximately 60-75ºF (15-24ºC) and cannot survive below 55ºF (13ºC). They can grow up to 2 ft at the most.

References

CV Morton, (1957) Observations on Cultivated Ferns, IV. The Species of Davallia, American Fern Journal.
https://www.houseplantsexpert.com/rabbits-foot-fern.html

Davalliaceae
Ferns of Oceania
Flora of Fiji
Garden plants of Oceania
House plants